Ann Harada (born February 3, 1964) is an American actress and singer who was first known for the musical Avenue Q, in which she originated the role of Christmas Eve, the heavily accented Japanese therapist.

Early life
Harada was born in Honolulu, Hawaii. She was raised in Hawaii and attended the Punahou School and Brown University. She was active in theatre from high school. After college, she moved to New York City and, anticipating working in production, worked with producer Suzanne Schwartz. Finding stage production not completely satisfactory, she performed with the New York City Gay Men's Chorus as a vocalist, performed cabaret, and appeared in the Broadway production of M. Butterfly.

Career
Harada earned her Equity Card in 1987 when she was cast in Maury Yeston and Larry Gelbart's 1,2,3,4,5 at Manhattan Theatre Club.  She is a member of the Vineyard Theatre's Community of Artists and appeared in four original musicals there including Hit the Lights!.

In 1998, Harada starred in the National Asian American Theatre Company's highly praised All-Asian production of William Finn's Falsettoland. Peter Marks of The New York Times described her rendition of "Holding to the Ground" as a "full-throttle success". Also in 1998, Harada had a small part in the Todd Solondz film Happiness as one of the co-workers of Jane Adams's character.

Harada was in the original Broadway company of Seussical in 2000.  She had also been in its first workshop and all of the pre-Broadway iterations of that show.  About her experience she said "It was such a roller-coaster ride — everything that could go wrong went wrong. You'd just show up to work every day and go, 'I wonder what's going to happen today.'...There was way too much drama for one show to take, and it didn't deserve that kind of drama because it's really a great little show. . . . I loved it, and I still love it. . . I just keep thinking about what it was like doing that first workshop and us all just being so blown away by it and being so excited."

Avenue Q 
Harada was involved in Avenue Q since the first performance of the show at the York Theatre in 2000.<ref name="playbill">Gans, Andrew. [http://www.playbill.com/celebritybuzz/article/89145.html DIVA TALK: Catching Up with Avenue Q'''s Ann Harada; Family Night at the Cabaret Convention and Showstoppers!] , Playbill, 22 October 2004</ref>  Lyricist Amanda Green had recommended Harada to Avenue Q writers Robert Lopez and Jeff Marx. She opened Avenue Q at the Vineyard Theatre in New York in March 2003 and moved with the show to Broadway that July.  She took a break for maternity leave in late 2004, returning in early 2005.  Her son is named Elvis. Harada left the Broadway company of Avenue Q on 26 February 2006.  Her role was taken over by Ann Sanders. In June 2006, she opened the London production of Avenue Q at the Noël Coward Theatre in the West End. She played her last performance on 18 November 2006; the role was taken over by Naoko Mori. She is the only actress who played the role of Christmas Eve in both the Broadway and West End productions of Avenue Q.

About her performance in the Broadway production, Ben Brantley wrote in The New York Times: "Counseling the romantically troubled Kate, she temporarily drops her habitually pinched voice to deliver, in the show's wittiest coup de théâtre, a full-throated ballad in the manner of a 1950's musical diva...The more you love someone/The more you want to kill him, Christmas sings in a shivery, rafters-shaking alto. And though you can construe the 
song as a satire if you choose, there is no doubt that Christmas means every word she sings." Hilton Als, in The New Yorker, in another rave for the show, noted that Avenue Q "has so much to recommend it...But not to single out the remarkable Ann Harada — a funny girl who can sing, act, and let the audience in on the joke all at the same time — would be a mistake."

On July 6, 2009, Harada returned as part of the final Broadway cast of Avenue Q.  The show closed on September 13, 2009. A September 15 article in The New York Times stated the show would relocate to an Off-Broadway location and resume production October 3.

Harada has reprised the character of Christmas Eve for a series of one-night-only benefits for Broadway Cares/Equity Fights AIDS originally entitled Christmas Eve with Christmas Eve. The premise is that Christmas Eve (the night) is when all of the fantasies of Christmas Eve (the character) come true and all of those fantasies involve singing duets with Broadway leading men in ways that hysterically reinterpret well-known showtunes. The third annual Christmas Eve with Christmas Eve was on 12 December 2011.

The fourth Christmas Eve with Christmas Eve was held on 2 December 2013. Harada's guests for 2013 included Cinderella's Santino Fontana, Max von Essen and Smash co-stars  Leslie Odom, Jr. and Wesley Taylor.
 The fifth edition on December 14, 2015, bore a new name, Christmas Eve's Holiday Hunkfest. It featured Adam Jacobs, Michael Rupert, and Joel Perez among the hunks. The sixth edition Hunkfest on December 14, 2016 featured Santino Fontana, James Monroe Iglehart, and Corey Cott.

 2000s 
On April 24, 2007, Harada joined the Broadway company of Les Misérables playing Madame Thénardier; she replaced the British actress Jenny Galloway. Harada left Les Misérables on October 30, 2007, replaced by Galloway.

Harada is featured in the Wes Anderson-directed commercials for AT&T, which began airing in September 2007.

Harada rejoined Avenue Q star John Tartaglia as a guest on his television show Johnny and the Sprites.  Harada sings the Laurence O'Keefe song "Everything Must Go" on an episode entitled  "The Sprites Save Grotto's Grove".  It premiered on the Disney Channel on 22 March 2008.

Harada did "sharp work" in The Muny's production of High School Musical in St. Louis in 2008 playing Ms. Darbus, the drama teacher.

She was in the original cast of the Dolly Parton musical 9 to 5 (based on the film of the same name) as Kathy and in the ensemble through June 21, 2009. She left to return to the cast of Avenue Q.

 2010s 

In May 2011, she played the role of Annette in a production of Yasmina Reza's Tony-winning play God of Carnage at George Street Playhouse in New Brunswick, New Jersey.

Her recording of A Last Confession (lyrics by William Butler Yeats) on Steve Marzullo's album Show Some Beauty was a Playlist pick in USA Today in June 2011.

She appeared as Linda, the stage manager of the show-within-a-show, in eighteen episodes of NBC's musical drama Smash alongside Debra Messing, Anjelica Huston, Jack Davenport and her 9 to 5 colleague Megan Hilty.

From January 2013 to December 2014, she has appeared in the Broadway premiere of Cinderella as the stepsister Charlotte. In the original company, she worked alongside Laura Osnes as Cinderella, Victoria Clark as the Fairy Godmother, Harriet Harris as her mother, Cinderella's stepmother, and Marla Mindelle as her sister, the other stepsister, Gabrielle.

In its review of the show, Variety said that Harada gives "a hoot of a perf". Scott Brown of New York, in his rave, wrote: "The score floods your brain with Rodgers's stately, aching melodies, including the bewitching 'Ten Minutes Ago' and the clucking, catchy 'Stepsister's Lament,' translated here into a go-for-broke chorus number centering on Harada. (If you only know Harada as stolid stage-manager Linda on Smash — and if you're a faithful enough Smash alpha-viewer to fixate on such things — then you owe yourself this.)  "

Harada was the star of her own installment of Lincoln Center's 2014 American Songbook series at Jazz at Lincoln Center's  Allen Room in New York City on 22 February 2014. Her set included "OK, That's Ten" a very short, previously unheard song written by Marc Shaiman and Scott Wittman for her character on Smash.

Harada was in the original cast of the "goofily endearing" new original musical Brooklynite, with Matt Doyle, Nicolette Robinson and Nick Cordero. The superhero show opened its world premiere run at the Vineyard Theatre in New York on 25 February 2015.

On 8 June 2015 in a one-night-only concert of Bombshell, Smash's show-within-the show, Harada reprised her Smash role as Linda the Stage Manager , then "as a substitute Marilyn" performed I Never Met a Wolf Who Didn't Love to Howl. "The fun, infections number earned the night's first major ovation", according to Entertainment Weekly's Hillary Busis.

In June 2016, Harada appeared as Maggie Jones in The Muny's "spectacular" production of 42nd Street and was "a treat" in its production of Mamma Mia! in July.

In October 2016, "the excellent Ann Harada" appeared as Stacey in The Women's Project's world premiere of Stuffed, a new play by the comedienne Lisa Lampanelli with "some laughs here, some genuine pain and even a bit of insight".

"Ann Harada is especially good in the unlikely-sounding triple role of the Emperor of Japan, a French admiral and a whorehouse madam"  in John Doyle's staging of Stephen Sondheim's Pacific Overtures, which opened at Classic Stage Company in New York on May 4. 2017 and ran through June 18, 2017.

Harada "brings down the house" in the world premiere of the Thanksgiving musical, The New World, at Bucks County Playhouse in October, 2017.

In the March 2019 Encores! production of the dated 1938 Rodgers and Hart musical, I Married an Angel "[i]n a relatively insignificant role, Ann Harada manages to steal the show at the end with the perfectly hilarious delivery of a single line."

 2020s 

In early 2020, Harada played Pile of Poo in the new musical Emojiland, as she told one reporter. "I don't have any dignity and I think it's fine. For better or worse, poo's the most famous emoji. If it's good enough for Patrick Stewart, it's good enough for me."

On April 26, 2020, Harada rejoined three of her Pacific Overtures castmates for Take Me to the World: A Sondheim 90th Birthday Celebration on Broadway.com in an "inventive" split-screen-conference-call-like version of the song "Someone in a Tree". In Vulture, Jackson McHenry wrote that the number "really moved [him] in the moment. It's all about assembling one moment from shattered places and times, somehow both a song about a moment lost to history and about what it's like to try to comprehend the world right now from your laptop screen." Wesley Morris, writing in The New York Times, described this performance of "Someone in a Tree" as "pure magic...a fittingly ambitious and witty acknowledgment of Sondheim's audacity and as a metaphor for the teamwork necessary to achieve anything meaningfully, enduringly decent this year" and named it one of the Best Performances of 2020. Take Me to the World: A Sondheim 90th Birthday Celebration won the 2021 Drama League Award for Outstanding Digital Concert Production.

In October 2020, Harada was announced in the cast of a new musical show from Apple TV+ starring Cecily Strong and Keegan-Michael Key. Written by Cinco Paul and Ken Daurio, a backpacking couple get lost and find "the magical town of Schmigadoon, in which everyone acts as if they're in a studio musical from the 1940s". In Schmigadoon!, Harada plays Florence Menlove, the wife of the Mayor (played by Alan Cumming), about whom she sings "He's a Queer One, That Man o' Mine" in the series' third episode.

In May 2022, Harada played Jack's Mother in the Encores! production of Into the Woods'' by Stephen Sondheim and James Lapine. In the New York Times Critic's Pick review of the production, she was described as a "comic genius". She reprised the role in the Broadway revival beginning September 27, 2022, when she replaced Aymee Garcia in the part.

Awards and nominations

Broadway

Other stage credits

References

External links

Ann Harada Broadway.com Star File
 

1964 births
American stage actresses
Brown University alumni
Living people
Actresses from Honolulu
Punahou School alumni
American actresses of Japanese descent
21st-century American women